The Canon AC lens-mount was a proprietary lens mount for the Canon T80. The lens mount was a variation of the then-standard Canon FD for auto-focus.

See also
Canon New FD 35-70 mm f/4 AF

References 

 AC Mount
Canon FD lenses
Lens mounts